AIM Media may refer to:

 Active Interest Media, a specialty magazine publisher
 AIM Media Management, a newspaper publisher based in Dallas, Texas, or one of its subsidiaries:
 AIM Media Midwest
 AIM Media Indiana
 AIM Media Texas